Gazi Zehi (also Romanized as Gazī Zehī; also known as Gaze’ī-ye Pā’īn, Gazezai, Gazī, Gaz’ī-ye Pā’īn, Gazo’ī Pā‘īn, Qārezā’ī, Qāzeh Zā’ī, Qāzeh Zāy, and Qazo‘ī Pā‘īn) is a village in Talang Rural District, Talang District, Qasr-e Qand County, Sistan and Baluchestan Province, Iran. At the 2006 census, its population was 90, in 26 families.

References 

Populated places in Qasr-e Qand County